Youness Mankari (born 28 April 1983, in Casablanca) is a Moroccan international footballer who currently plays for Widad Fez. He was designated best midfielder of the Moroccan League for the season 2008/2009.

References

External links
 Fifa Profile
 Younes Mankari - goalzz.com
 

1983 births
Living people
Footballers from Casablanca
Association football midfielders
Moroccan footballers
Wydad AC players
Ettifaq FC players
Al Kharaitiyat SC players
Kawkab Marrakech players
Moroccan expatriate footballers
Expatriate footballers in Saudi Arabia
Expatriate footballers in Qatar
Morocco international footballers